Valeriy Ivanovych Movchan (born 14 June 1959) is a Soviet cyclist. He won the gold medal in Men's team pursuit in the 1980 Summer Olympics. He was affiliated with Avangard Kharkiv.

References 

1959 births
Living people
People from Sughd Region
Sportspeople from Kharkiv
Cyclists at the 1980 Summer Olympics
Olympic cyclists of the Soviet Union
Olympic gold medalists for the Soviet Union
Soviet male cyclists
Tajikistani male cyclists
Ukrainian male cyclists
Olympic medalists in cycling
Medalists at the 1980 Summer Olympics
Honoured Masters of Sport of the USSR